The University Heights Water Storage and Pumping Station Historic District is in the University Heights neighborhood of the City of San Diego, California. The historic district includes the North Park Water Tower, located at the intersection of Idaho Street and Howard Avenue in central San Diego.

The water tower was listed on the National Register of Historic Places in 2013 and was designated as a Local Historic Civil Engineering Landmark in 2015.

See also
National Register of Historic Places listings in San Diego, California
National Register of Historic Places listings in San Diego County, California
Historic districts in California

References

Buildings and structures in San Diego
Historic districts in San Diego
National Register of Historic Places in San Diego
Historic districts on the National Register of Historic Places in California